Federal Statistical Office may refer to
 Federal Statistical Office of Germany
 Federal Statistical Office  (Switzerland)